Turricula tornata, common name the turned turrid, is a species of sea snail, a marine gastropod mollusk in the family Clavatulidae.

Description
The size of an adult shell varies between 60 mm and 75 mm.

The shell is smooth and ivory-like. The lower portion of body whorl shows revolving striae. The upper portion of the whorls are broadly, concavely
channeled. The anal sinus is broad and shallow. The siphonal canal is long.  The color of the shell is whitish or yellowish, flexuously strigated with light brown.

Distribution
This species has a wide distribution : from the Red Sea to Thailand and the Western Pacific.

References

 Grant, U. S. & Gale, H. R. (1931). Catalogue of the marine Pliocene and Pleistocene Mollusca of California and adjacent region. Memoirs of the San Diego Society of Natural History 1: 1036 pp. + 32 pl

External links
 

tornata
Gastropods described in 1817